Platypelis cowanii is a species of frog in the family Microhylidae.
It is endemic to Madagascar.
Its natural habitat is subtropical or tropical moist montane forests.

Sources

c
Endemic frogs of Madagascar
Amphibians described in 1882
Taxa named by George Albert Boulenger
Taxonomy articles created by Polbot
Taxobox binomials not recognized by IUCN